The Archeological Service Agency (ASHA) is a government agency under the supervision of the Albanian Ministry of Culture. The agency's role is to focus on the protection of the archeological heritage in Albania, affected by natural disasters, informal construction activity and archeological findings.

References

 
Cultural Heritage agencies of Albania